Bhumibol Adulyadej of Thailand received numerous decorations and honorary appointments as monarch of Thailand. Thai monarchical titles or styles are listed in order of degrees of sovereignty, nobility, and honor:

Title 

 5 December 19279 July 1935: His Highness Prince Bhumibol Adulyadej
 10 July 19359 June 1946: His Royal Highness Prince Bhumibol Adulyadej
 9 June 194613 October 2016: His Majesty The King
13 October 2016 - 4 May 2019: His Majesty King Bhumibol Adulyadej
Since 5 May 2019: His Majesty King Bhumibol Adulyadej The Great

Military Rank 
10 May 1946 - 26 March 1950: First Lieutenant
26 March 1950 - 13 October 2016: Field Marshal
24 March 1950 - 13 October 2016: Admiral of the Fleet
26 March 1950 - 13 October 2016: Marshal of the Royal Thai Air Force

Designation

Honours

Thai Honours

Hereditary Orders
  Sovereign Grand Master of The Most Auspicious Order of the Rajamitrabhorn, 22 November 196213 October 2016
  The Most Illustrious Order of the Royal House of Chakri
 Sovereign Grand Master, 9 June 194613 October 2016
 Knight, 14 November 19389 June 1946
  Sovereign Grand Master of The Ancient and Auspicious Order of the Nine Gems, 9 June 194613 October 2016
  The Most Illustrious Order of Chula Chom Klao
 Sovereign Grand Master, 9 June 194613 October 2016
 Knight Grand Cross (First Class), 20 September 19359 June 1946
  Sovereign Grand Master of The Honourable Order of Rama, 9 June 194613 October 2016
  Sovereign Grand Master of The Most Exalted Order of the White Elephant, 9 June 194613 October 2016
  Sovereign Grand Master of The Most Noble Order of the Crown of Thailand, 9 June 194613 October 2016
  Sovereign Grand Master of The Most Admirable Order of the Direkgunabhorn, 22 July 199113 October 2016
  Sovereign Grand Master of The Order of Symbolic Propitiousness Ramkeerati, 26 November 198713 October 2016

Medals for acts of bravery
  Grand Master of Bravery Medal 9 June 194613 October 2016
  Grand Master of Freeman Safeguarding Medal 21 February 196913 October 2016

Medals for services to the State
  Chakra Mala Medal of Dushdi Mala Medal - Civilian 9 June 194613 October 2016
  Grand Master of Border Service Medal  22 September 195413 October 2016
  Grand Master of Chakra Mala Medal 9 June 194613 October 2016

Medals for services to the Monarch
  Royal Cypher Medal of Rama VIII (First Class) 14 November 193913 October 2016

Foreign honours

Orders of the Sultanates of Malaysia

Awards

Memberships

Honorary doctorates 

In 1997 the king captured the world record for the most honorary degrees—136—held by anyone.

Thai academic

Foreign academic 
In August 1962 the Australian National University refused to award the king an honorary doctorate on the grounds that he had not completed his degree at the University of Lausanne. The refusal prompted a minor diplomatic row between the university and the Thai government.

Honorific eponyms

Place 
 : Bhumibol Dam, Tak
 : King's College Under Royal Patronage, Nakhon Pathom
 : Bhumibol Adulyadej Hospital, Bangkok
 : Bhumibol Bridge
 : Rama IX Road, Bangkok
 : Rama IX Bridge, Bangkok
 : Bhumibol Sangkeet Building, College of Music, Mahidol University, Nakorn Pathom
 : King Bhumibol Adulyadej Square, Cambridge, Massachusetts

Species 
 Trisepalum bhumibolianum
 Amphioctopus rex (Nateewathana & Norman, 1999)
 Potamon bhumibol Naiyanetr, 2001

See also 
 List of honours of the Thai royal family by country

References 

Bhumibol Adulyadej titles
Titles
Adulyadej, Bhumibol
Bhumibol Adulyadej